Hsieh Chia-hsien (born 8 April 1976 in Hualien City, Hualien County, Taiwan) is a Taiwanese professional baseball player. Originally drafted by the Taiwan Major League's Taichung Agan in 1998, after TML's merger into CPBL he has been playing for the Chinese Professional Baseball League's Macoto Gida and its successors Macoto Cobras and Dmedia T-REX since 2003. A left-handed outfielder and first baseman, he is well known for his offensive and powerful batting. He has been a frequent member of the Chinese Taipei national baseball team since 1999 and holds a controversial record of reaching career 100th home run fastest in the history of professional baseball in Taiwan in within only 454 games; CPBL did not recognize this record because his first 75 home runs were hit in the TML. He also hit CPBL's milestone 5000th home run on April 12, 2006.

He competed at the 2004 Summer Olympics.

Basic Information
Number: 55
Height: 176 cm
Weight: 87 kg
Bats: Left

Career Records

See also
 List of the Taiwan national baseball team squad at the 2006 Asian Games
 List of the Taiwan national baseball team squad at the 2006 World Baseball Classic
 Chinese Taipei national baseball team

References

1976 births
Living people
Asian Games gold medalists for Chinese Taipei
Asian Games medalists in baseball
Asian Games silver medalists for Chinese Taipei
Baseball outfielders
Baseball players at the 2002 Asian Games
Baseball players at the 2004 Summer Olympics
Baseball players at the 2006 Asian Games
Macoto Cobras players
Medalists at the 2002 Asian Games
Medalists at the 2006 Asian Games
Olympic baseball players of Taiwan
People from Hualien County
Sinon Bulls players
Taichung Agan players
Taiwanese baseball players
2006 World Baseball Classic players
Sport in Hualien
Macoto Gida players